Marco Antonio Cuevas Cruz (November 18, 1933 in Antigua Guatemala – February 2, 2009) son of Angel Rafael Cuevas del Cid and Maria Soledad Cruz Sierra. He had three brothers: Marta Cuevas del León, Rafael Cuevas del Cid and José Rodolfo Cuevas Cruz. He studied at Colégio de Infantes and the Liceo Guatemala, where he graduated as valedictorian. In 1955 he represented Guatemala in the second Pan American Games, having won the gold medal in rowing competitions, along with his team.

He studied civil engineering at the University of San Carlos of Guatemala (USAC). At that time, he worked at the General Directorate of Roads and the Institute of Development of Municipal Works (INFOM), where he met Engineer Raul Aguilar Batres, great precursor of planning in Guatemala, who urged him to undertake graduate studies in urban planning. He attended the program led by Yale University, based in Lima, Peru, from 1960 to 1963. Upon his return to Guatemala in 1965, he continued to work in the INFOM as the first graduate in Urban Planning in the history of Guatemala. He then introduced urban planning methods that were used to make more effective the execution of public works and created the Center for Urban and Regional Studies (CEUR) USAC, where he taught until 1978, when he was appointed as the first manager of the Guatemalan Railroads, after its nationalization during the government of Julio César Méndez Montenegro.

Between 1970 and 1994, with a team of professionals, developed several master plans for the cities of Rio de Janeiro (Brazil), Santa Cruz (Bolivia), San Pedro Sula (Honduras), Nairobi (Kenya) and Guatemala (1972- 2000). In 1986, as part of the activities of the Centre for Political Studies (CEDEP), he participated in the drafting of the new Constitution of Guatemala and, in the same year, was in charge of the formation of the new electoral system in the first election of a civilian government during the internal armed conflict of Guatemala (1959-1996). In the 1960s he served as a member of the Board of the Faculty of Engineering of the USAC. From 1990 to 2007 he led the development of several low-cost housing projects, having introduced innovative concepts for planning and financing. At the same time, he developed the first plan for territorial ordering, at the national level, in Guatemala. He died on February 2, 2009.

The National Library of Guatemala inaugurated in 2016 a special room that houses the private collection of books on urban planning that belonged to Marco Antonio Cuevas.

See also
 Raul Aguilar Batres

Bibliography 

 
 
 
 
 
 
 
 

People from Guatemala City
Civil engineers
1933 births
2009 deaths
Guatemalan engineers